Alan Nolet (born 17 December 1967) is a Canadian gymnast. He competed at the 1988 Summer Olympics, the 1992 Summer Olympics and the 1996 Summer Olympics.

References

External links
 

1967 births
Living people
Canadian male artistic gymnasts
Olympic gymnasts of Canada
Gymnasts at the 1988 Summer Olympics
Gymnasts at the 1992 Summer Olympics
Gymnasts at the 1996 Summer Olympics
Gymnasts from Toronto
Commonwealth Games medallists in gymnastics
Commonwealth Games gold medallists for Canada
Commonwealth Games silver medallists for Canada
Commonwealth Games bronze medallists for Canada
Gymnasts at the 1990 Commonwealth Games
Gymnasts at the 1994 Commonwealth Games
Gymnasts at the 1995 Pan American Games
Pan American Games bronze medalists for Canada
Pan American Games medalists in gymnastics
Medalists at the 1995 Pan American Games
20th-century Canadian people
21st-century Canadian people
Medallists at the 1990 Commonwealth Games
Medallists at the 1994 Commonwealth Games